Ponç Carbonell (Latin Pontius; died c. 1320) was a Catalan Franciscan scholar who also served as confessor to the Kings of Aragon.

References

Roman Catholic priests from Catalonia
Spanish Franciscans
1320s deaths
Year of birth unknown